Cristina Rodlo (born May 21, 1990) is a Mexican actress who appeared as Isabel Urrutia Zavaleta in 93 episodes of  Vuelve Temprano (2016 – 2017) and 23 episodes of El Vato (2017). She has starred in feature films as Fabiana in Perdida and as Suzu in the 2019 remake of Miss Bala, and played a lead role as Ambar in the horror movie No One Gets Out Alive in 2021.

Biography 
Cristina Rodlo  was born on May 21, 1990, was brought up in the city of Torreón in Coahuila, northern Mexico. She took part in a theatre production at the age of 11 and decided from that moment that she wanted to be an actress. After attending auditions in Monterrey for a position at the American Musical and Dramatic Academy (AMDA) in New York City, Roldo was offered a scholarship, only to be told by her parents it was unaffordable. She sought sponsorship from local companies unsuccessfully, but eventually found a local politician who agreed to finance the cost of her training, so at age 18, she left Mexico to learn acting at AMDA in New York City. Rodlo now resides in Los Angeles(2020).

Career
After graduating from AMDA, Rodlo returned to Mexico, as she was advised that "she did not look Mexican enough" to land stereotypical Latino roles in the United states at the time. Rodlo forged a successful career in Mexico, appearing in 23 episodes of El Vato and 92 episodes of Vuelve Temprano between 2016-2017, eventually achieving a nomination of Mejor revelación femenina (Best Newcomer - Female) at the 2016 Diosas de Plata awards, for her performance as Jackie Ramírez in the 2015 movie Ladrones (Bandits)

in 2019, Rodlo broke into American television with roles as the High Priestess spirit of Death, Yaritza, in Amazon Prime's Too Old to Die Young , and as Luz Ojeda in the AMC historica drama The Terror. The same year, Rodlo played Suzu in the 2019 remake of Miss Bala, with co-star Gina Rodriguez.

In 2020, Rodlo joined the inaugural cast of 68 Whiskey to play army medic Rosa Alvarez, in an American military comedy-drama television series (purportedly similar to M*A*S*H) produced by Ron Howard. In 2021, Rodlo played the lead role in the Santiago Menghini directed Netflix horror film No One Gets Out Alive, alongside Marc Menchaca. The film was shot in Bucharest, Romania, during the COVID-19 pandemic.

In 2022, Rodlo joined the cast in a main role as Talia Perez for season 2 of Halo alongside fellow newcomer Joseph Morgan.

Filmography

Film

Television

Awards and nominations

References

External links

Cristina Rodlo Instagram
 Cristina Rodlo twitter
 Cristina Rodlo Vimeo

1990 births
21st-century Mexican actresses
Actresses from Coahuila
American Musical and Dramatic Academy alumni
Living people
Mexican television actresses
Mexican telenovela actresses
Mexican film actresses